Donald W. Dorr (born 1939) is a former Republican member of the Pennsylvania House of Representatives.

References

Republican Party members of the Pennsylvania House of Representatives
Living people
1939 births
People from Falls City, Nebraska
20th-century American politicians